The British Astronomical Association (BAA) was formed in 1890 as a national body to support the UK's amateur astronomers.

Throughout its history, the BAA has encouraged observers to make scientifically valuable observations, often in collaboration with professional colleagues. Among the BAA's first presidents was Walter Maunder, discoverer of the seventeenth century dearth in sunspots now known as the Maunder Minimum which he achieved by analysing historical observations. Later, this spirit of observing the night sky scientifically was championed by George Alcock, who discovered five comets and five novae using nothing more than a pair of binoculars.

The BAA continues to contribute to the science of astronomy, even despite modern competition from space-based telescopes and highly automated professional observatories. Modern digital sensors, coupled with techniques such as lucky imaging, mean that even modest amateur equipment can rival what professional observatories could have achieved a few decades ago. The vastness of the night sky, together with the sheer number of amateur observatories, mean that BAA members are often the first to pick up new phenomena. In recent years, the Association's leading supernova hunter, Tom Boles (President 2003–5), has discovered over 150 supernovae. He now holds the world record for the greatest number of such events discovered by any individual in history.

More recently the BAA has worked increasingly with international partners. Modern communications allow astronomers in different time zones around the world to hand over the monitoring of variable stars and planetary weather systems to  colleagues on other continents as the Sun comes up, resulting in a 24-hour watch on the sky. For example, the Association's Variable Star Section works closely with the American Association of Variable Star Observers, meanwhile its Jupiter Section works with a global network of planetary observers through the JUPOS collaboration.

Publications

The Association's longest standing publication is its Journal, published six times a year and sent to all members. Once a year, the Association also publishes a Handbook which comprises an almanac for the following year. Electronic bulletins are issued to give more immediate notice by email of discoveries, astronomical news and BAA meetings.

Structure
The Association operates a wide range of observing Sections which specialise in particular branches of astronomy, welcoming observers and astronomy enthusiasts of all abilities in a spirit of collaboration and mutual help.

It also founded and supports the Campaign for Dark Skies, a UK-wide campaign against excessive light pollution.

In 2022, after seventy-nine years of leasing office space from the Royal Astronomical Society, in Burlington House, Piccadilly, London the association moved out.

History
In October 1890, the BAA was formed to support amateur astronomers in the UK. In many ways it is a counterpart to the Royal Astronomical Society - which primarily supports professional observers - and the two organisations have long shared the same premises. The idea for this organisation was first publicly proposed by Irish astronomer William H. S. Monck in a letter published in The English Mechanic on July 12.

Playing a significant role in the founding of the Association was English astronomer E. Walter Maunder, with the help of his brother Frid Maunder and William H. Maw. The first meeting of the Association was held on 1890 October 24, with 60 of the initial 283 members in attendance. Initially it was decided to run the association with a provisional 48-member Council that included four women: Margaret Huggins, Elizabeth Brown, Agnes Clerke and Agnes Giberne.

The society formed several observing Sections for specialised topics in astronomy. Elizabeth Brown, possibly the only woman in England at the time to own her own observatory, became Director of the Solar Section. The Association was presented with or bequeathed various astronomical instruments, but lacked the funds to build their own observatory. A total of 477 instruments were acquired during the first 117 years since the Association was founded.

Eclipse Expeditions
In addition to members making independent arrangements there have been several more or less officially organised expeditions to observe several total solar eclipses in various parts of the World. These include:-
1896 to Vadsø, Norway for the eclipse of 9 August.
1898 to India for the eclipse of 22 January.
1900 to the United States, Portugal, Spain, Algeria and at sea (aboard the R.M.S. Austral) for the eclipse of 28 May.
1905 to Burgos (Spain), Labrador (Canada) and at sea (aboard the ss Arcadia) for the eclipse of 30 August.
1914 for eclipse of 21 August.
1922 to Stanthorpe (Queensland) by members of the New South Wales Branch for the eclipse of 21 September.
1936 to the Mediterranean for the eclipse of 19 June.
1973 aboard the cruise ship Monte Umbe 30 June.
1999 to Truro, Cornwall for the eclipse of 11 August.

Branches
The Association held monthly meetings in London, but also established branches to cater for members who could not attend London activities and desired to meet in their own areas.

The first of these was the Northwestern Branch which served members in the Northwest of England, centred on Manchester. The Branch was formed in 1892, in 1903 it seceded from the BAA to form the Manchester Astronomical Society.
North Western Branch Presidents
Samuel O’Kell 1892-1895
Prof. Thomas Hamilton Core 1895-1903

In 1891, a group of amateurs in Australia began discussing the idea of setting up branches of the BAA in their own country. What would become the New South Wales Branch was established in 1895 and would be the only one to survive for more than a brief period. This branch became the second oldest astronomy organisation in Australia and is still in existence. It is an affiliate organisation now called Sydney City Skywatchers to better reflect its location and membership.
New South Wales Branch Presidents
John Tebbutt 1894-1896
George Handley Knibbs 1896-1898
Rev. Thomas Roseby 1898-1900
Walter Frederick Gale 1900-1902
William John MacDonnell 1902-1904
George Denton Hirst 1904-1906
Charles J. Merfield 1906-1907
Hugh Wright 1907-1909
James Nangle 1909-1911
Rev. Thomas Roseby 1911-1914
Walter Frederick Gale 1914-1923
Rev. Edward F. Pigot 1923-1925
J. J. Richardson 1925-1927
Walter Frederick Gale 1927-1929
James Nangle 1929-1930
Walter Frederick Gale 1930-1932 & 1932-1933
Rev. William O'Leary 1933-1934 & 1934-1935
Walter Frederick Gale 1935-1936
Alan Patrick Mackerras 1936-1937
Walter Frederick Gale 1937-1938 & 1938-1939
Henry Herbert Baker 1939-1940
Harley Weston Wood 1940-1942
Walter Frederick Gale 1942-1943
Alan Patrick Mackerras 1943-1945
Horace Edgar Frank Pinnock 1945-1946
Alan Patrick Mackerras 1946-1947
W. H. Robertson 1947-1950
D. Coleman-Trainor 1950-1951
Alan Patrick Mackerras 1951-1954
Harley Weston Wood 1954-1956
Rev. Thomas Noël Burke-Gaffney 1956-1958
W. Kemp Robertson 1958-1960
F. J. Bannister 1960-1962
Alan Patrick Mackerras 1962-1964
W. H. Robertson 1964-1966
Noel James Halsey Bissaker 1966-1968
W. Swanston 1968-1971
W. E. Moser 1971-1974
K. Sims 1974-1976
R. Giller 1976-1978
T. L. Morgan 1978-1979
F. N. Traynor 1979-1981
S. J. Elwin 1981-1982
F. N. Traynor 1982-1984
J. Jackson 1984-1986
Colin Bembrick 1986-1988
D. Alan Yates 1988-1990
George Smith 1990-1994
Monty Leventhal 1995-1996
Ralph Buttigieg 1996-1998
Michael Chapman 1998-2000
 Dr. Wayne Orchiston 2000-2001 
Elizabeth Budek 2001-2003 
Michael Chapman 2003-2016 
Monty Leventhal OAM 2016-2019
Dr Toner Stevenson 2019-2021
Ann Cairns 2021- current

A West of Scotland Branch was established by an inaugural meeting held on 23 November 1894, to be based in Glasgow. In 1905 authority was granted to enrol members from the whole of Scotland, but it was not until 1937 that the name was changed to "Scottish Branch". In 1954 the Branch seceded from the BAA to form the Astronomical Society of Glasgow.
West of Scotland Branch Presidents 
Walter C. Bergius 1895-1897
John Danskin 1897-1899
Rev. Edward Bruce Kirk 1899-1901
John Danskin 1901-1903
Robert Robertson 1903-1905
James Waddell 1905-1907
Major John Cassells 1907-1909
Archibald Campbell 1909-1911
Dr. Alexander D. Ross 1911-1913
Archibald A. Young 1913-1915
John Johnston Ross 1915-1917
Frank C. Thomson 1917-1919
Henry McEwan 1919-1921
John O. Ross 1921-1923
John D. McDougall 1923-1925
Charles Cochrane 1925-1927
Charles Clelland 1927-1929
Thomas L. MacDonald 1929-1931
David Buchanan Duncanson 1931-1933
William B. Inverarity 1933-1935
George Douglas Buchanan 1935-1937
Prof. William Marshall Smart 1937-1938
Scottish Branch Presidents 
Prof. William Marshall Smart 1938-1939
Prof. William Michael Herbert Greaves 1939-1941
Charles T. McIvin 1941-1943
Prof. William Marshall Smart 1943-1945
Rev. J. Graham 1945-1947
W. H. Marshall 1947-1949
C. Walmsley 1951-1953
Dr. T. R. Tannahill 1953-1954

In 1896 an East of Scotland Branch was formed. This Branch was dissolved due to lack of support on 3 October 1902.
East of Scotland Branch Presidents
William Peck 1896-1898
William Firth 1898-1900
John Turner 1900-1902

In 1897 a second Australian Branch was formed by 13 members living in Victoria. At the London AGM of 1907 the President noted that "the Victoria Branch appears to be in a moribund condition".
Victoria Branch Presidents 
Robert Ellery 1897-1900
Rev. John Meiklejohn 1900-1901
Ernest Frederick John Love 1901-1904
Prof. William Charles Kernot 1904-1905
Robert James Allman Barnard 1905
The Victoria Branch was re-established in 1951 (as 'The Victorian Branch'), but only lasted until 1963.
Victorian Branch Presidents 
Philip Crosbie Morrison 1951-1952
George Anderson 1953-1957
H. B. Lewis 1958-1959
Dr. G. F. Walker 1959-1960
C. S. Middleton 1960-1961
George Anderson 1961-1962

In 1901 at a meeting of the Birmingham Natural History and Philosophical Society it was proposed to form a Midland Branch of the BAA. Support proved to be less than had been envisioned and there are no reports of any activity after 1903.
Midland Branch Presidents
Sir Oliver Lodge 1901-1902
G. M. Seabroke 1902-1903

What would become the BAA Western Australia Branch started as the Western Australian Astronomical Society in 1912. When difficulties were encountered in the mid nineteen-twenties Prof. Ross highlighted the advantages of restarting within the BAA. The inaugural meeting was held on 29 March 1927. However support was still lacking and there is no recorded activity after September 1929.
Western Australia Branch President
Prof. Alexander David Ross 1927

Presidents

See also
 List of astronomical societies

References

External links

 BAA website

Video clips
 BAA YouTube channel

British astronomy organisations
Scientific organizations established in 1890
Organisations based in the City of Westminster
Amateur astronomy organizations
1890 establishments in the United Kingdom